Indiana School for the Deaf (ISD) is a fully accredited school for the deaf and hard of hearing, located in Indianapolis, Indiana.

It won the best deaf school in America in 2011 and 2014.

History

When the first school for the Deaf was established in Indiana, it was named Willard School, after the founder, William Willard.

William Willard was a deaf teacher who taught at Ohio School for the Deaf in Columbus, Ohio. He traveled to Indianapolis in May 1843 to propose the establishment of a Deaf School. Once he had the support of the General Assembly, he recruited approximately twelve students. He and his wife, Eliza, were teachers. Eventually, the school had grown and a law which was passed in January 1846, officially established the Willard School as the sixth state school for the Deaf and the first Deaf school to provide free education to Deaf and hard of hearing students. The school had actually moved a few times in different locations, when finally, the school was built on an  property on East 42nd Street. The name was changed to Indiana School for the Deaf. The school's main buildings on the current campus were added to the National Register of Historic Places in 1991.

New campus 
In spring 2022, the state of Indiana announced that the Indiana School for the Deaf will move to the campus of the Indiana School for the Blind and Visually Impaired.  About $225 million will be spent on new and renovated facilities for the two schools. They will remain separate institutions, but will be able to share some resources.

Academics
ISD offers several programs ranging from infants to high school. They are as follows: Parent Infant Program, Preschool, Elementary, Middle School, and High School.

The Parent Infant Program works closely with parents and their deaf or hard of hearing children from ages 0 to 3. When a student reaches 18 months of age, he or she can enroll at ISD as an official student. Preschool handles children up until Pre-Kindergarten. Elementary provides academics and activities for Kindergarten through 4th grade students. Middle school hosts grades 5 to 8, and High School hosts grades 9 through 12.

Residency
ISD is also a residential school for ages 3 to 21. It has dormitories where students reside throughout the week. Students arrive on Sundays and depart on Fridays. Dormitories are for students who live far enough not to be able to travel by bus every day to school. There are dormitories for male and female students: Preschool, Elementary, Middle School, and High School. ISD's residential programs offer extracurricular activities, peer interaction, student growth and development, achievement, and more.

Athletics
ISD offers several athletics starting from 5th grade to 12th grade. There are sports for both female and male students.
Male Sports
Football
Cross Country
Wrestling
Basketball
Baseball
Track and Field
Swimming
Female Sports
Volleyball
Basketball
Cheerleading
Track and Field
Swimming
Softball

See also
William Willard, founder and first Deaf superintendent of ISD
Olive Sanxay, poet, taught at ISD in early 1900s
Sean Berdy, actor, class of 2011
Phillip A. Emery, alumnus, deaf educator

References

External links

Indiana School for the Deaf Athletics

Historic districts on the National Register of Historic Places in Indiana
School buildings on the National Register of Historic Places in Indiana
Neoclassical architecture in Indiana
Schools for the deaf in the United States
Educational institutions established in 1843
Public schools in Indiana
1843 establishments in Indiana
Schools in Indianapolis
Public elementary schools in Indiana
Public middle schools in Indiana
Public high schools in Indiana
Public K-12 schools in the United States
Public boarding schools in the United States
Boarding schools in Indiana
National Register of Historic Places in Indianapolis